KJVA-LP (94.3 FM) is a radio station broadcasting a contemporary Christian format. Licensed to San Bernardino, California, United States, it serves the Inland Empire area.  The station is currently owned by Vida Abundante.

External links
 

Contemporary Christian radio stations in the United States
JVA-LP
Radio stations established in 2006
2006 establishments in California
JVA-LP